Wintanani (Aymara t'uxu, wintana window (from Spanish ventana), -ni a suffix to indicate ownership, "the one with a window", also spelled Ventanani) is a  mountain in the Cordillera Real in the Andes of Bolivia. It is located in the La Paz Department, Los Andes Province, in the northeastern part of the Batallas Municipality. Wintanani is situated southeast of Wila Lluxita, Mullu Apachita and Qulin Tuqu. It lies at the Jach'a Jawira valley with Janq'u Quta at its feet. Wila Lluxi and Phaq'u Kiwuta are opposite the mountain, beyond Jach'a Jawira.

References 

Mountains of La Paz Department (Bolivia)